Manuel Benavides   is one of the 67 municipalities of Chihuahua, in northern Mexico. The municipal seat lies at Manuel Benavides village. The municipality covers an area of 3,191.5 km².

As of the 2010 census, the municipality had a total population of 1,601 . 

The municipality had 183 localities, none of which had a population over 1,000.

Geography

Towns and villages
The municipality has 115 localities. The largest are:

Adjacent municipalities and counties
 Ocampo Municipality, Coahuila -southeast-east 
 Camargo Municipality - south
 Ojinaga Municipality - west
 Presidio County, Texas - north
 Brewster County, Texas - northeast

References

Municipalities of Chihuahua (state)
Chihuahua (state) populated places on the Rio Grande